The Weifu Fangkai Cup, also sometimes known as the Qiwang (not to be confused with the defunct Qiwang), is a Go competition in China.

Outline
The tournament is sponsored by the Wuxi people government. The tournament began in 2003.

Past winners and runners-up

References

Go competitions in China